South Street may refer to:

Streets by that name:
South Street (Durham), England
South Street, Bromley, England
South Street, Mayfair, England
South Street (Manhattan), United States of America
South Street (Perth, Western Australia)
South Street (Perth, Scotland)
South Street (Philadelphia), United States of America
South Street, Dorking, England
South Street, Staines-upon-Thames, England
South Street, Romford, England
Other places, on or associated with streets of that name:
South Street (MBTA station) in Boston, Massachusetts
South Street Seaport, a shopping complex overlooking the East River in Manhattan Island.
South Street Headhouse District, a neighborhood and commercial area in Philadelphia. 
Other:
Royal South Street Eisteddfod, recent festivals in Ballarat, Australia
South Street Society, Ballarat club and 100 years of its festivals 
"South Street" (song), a 1963 hit single by The Orlons